The Punjabi Suba movement was a long-drawn political agitation, launched by Punjabi speaking people (mostly Sikhs) demanding the creation of autonomous Punjabi Suba, or Punjabi-speaking state, in the post-independence Indian state of East Punjab. The movement is defined as the forerunner of Khalistan movement.

Borrowing from the pre-partition demands for a Sikh country, this movement demanded a fundamental constitutional autonomous state within India. Led by the Akali Dal, it resulted in the formation of the state of Punjab. The state of Haryana and the Union Territory of Chandigarh were also created and some Pahari-majority parts of the East Punjab were also merged with Himachal Pradesh following the movement. The result of the movement failed to satisfy its leaders.

Early years

Background
The movement was primarily conceived to secure a distinct Sikh political status as a safeguard for what was to be a small minority after independence; as Sikh leader Master Tara Singh wrote in 1945, "there is not the least doubt that the Sikh religion will live only as long as the Sikh panth exists as an organized entity." Calls for the Punjabi Suba were present as far back as February 1947. After the Partition of Punjab in 1947, the Sikh population,  especially in today's geographical area of Indian Punjab had become a clear majority (about 60%) in a contiguous, strategic land area for the first time in its history, with a new socio-political position. This enabled the Akali Dal to focus on expressing unencumbered Sikh political needs, free from the politics of the former Muslim majority in Punjab Province (British India) that had needed to be accommodated on its political platform before, and provided the opportunity for Sikhs themselves to express a degree of autonomy from the sway of the Congress party and the central government, through the Akali Dal, a Sikh political party active mainly in Punjab.. 

In January 1948, Akali Dal's three-member delegation of leaders, Harcharan Singh Bajwa, Bhupinder Singh Mann, and Giani Kartar Singh, met the Minister of Law and Justice Dr. B. R. Ambedkar. Ambedkar suggested that the Akali delegation demand a Punjabi-speaking state or Punjabi Subah (Punjabi Province) as a Sikh state, since the central government had declared a commitment to a linguistic basis for the reorganization of the states. The demand for a Punjabi Suba as a policy position was first presented in April 1948 by Tara Singh of the Shiromani Akali Dal  The Akali Dal considered the continued existence of the Sikh religion as predicated on the community acting as a consolidated political unit, which could only be effective with its own territorial unit. Regarding Sikh political participation as an integral to Sikh theology itself, as the Khalsa had been established in 1699 to organize religious Sikhs into a political community, one of Guru Gobind Singh's signature contributions to Sikhism, the party received strong support from its base by offering this political organization rooted in religious tradition.

Though it was commonly recognized at the time of Independence that the Indian states were created not on a rational basis, but were the result of the exigencies of the progressive British conquest of the subcontinent, and Congress had been advocating the reorganization of provinces for over a quarter century prior, a commission that had been set up in 1948 by the Government of India, tasked with drawing up clean-cut states corresponding to demographic and linguistic boundaries, was not effective in the northern part of the country, as it reconsidered its position on the north. While states across the country were extensively redrawn on linguistic lines at the behest of linguistic groups, the only languages not considered for statehood were Punjabi, Sindhi and Urdu. Its jurisdiction was limited to the southern states, with northern India kept out of its purview, specifically to avoid problems like those of Punjab, in particular issues raised by the Sikhs. In its 10 December 1948 report, the Commission recommended that "the formation of provinces on exclusively or even mainly linguistic considerations is not in the larger interests of the Indian nation." It recommended the reorganisation of the provinces of Madras, Bombay and Central Provinces and Berar primarily on the basis of geographical contiguity, financial self-sufficiency and ease of administration. Soon after the report was published, the Congress, at its Jaipur session, set up the "JVP committee" to study the recommendations of the Dhar Commission. The committee consisted of Jawaharlal Nehru and Vallabhbhai Patel, in addition to the Congress president Pattabhi Sitaramayya. In its report dated 1 April 1949, the Committee stated that the time was not suitable for formation of new provinces, but also stated that the "public sentiment is insistent and overwhelming, we, as democrats, have to submit to it, but subject to certain limitations in regard to the good of India as a whole.

The Sikhs now constituted a majority in the northwestern seven districts of the thirteen districts of East Punjab state at the time: Gurdaspur, Amritsar, Hoshiarpur, Jalandhar, Firozpur, Ludhiana, and Ambala, along with Patiala and East Punjab States Union, or PEPSU, which had been formed as an administrative unit in May 1948 out of the six Sikh princely states, and with sizable populations in surrounding districts. Meanwhile, Hindus formed a majority in the remaining six, including the southeastern districts between PEPSU and Delhi (Hisar, Karnal, Rohtak, and Gurgaon), and the eastern Kangra and Shimla divisions. In addition, while the Sikhs made up 35% of the province's population, the demographic pattern of urban and rural settlement was such that the Hindu population, whose majority status was new, was largely clustered in urban areas. The seven Sikh-majority districts would be the suggested basis of the Punjabi Suba, for which Tara Singh campaigned vigorously between late 1948 and early 1949.

The new platform of the Akali Dal mobilized strong support among Sikhs, and the Akali Dal passed a resolution in October 1948 in favor of continuing distinct representation of the Sikh minority through a Punjabi Suba, to protect against the aggressive communal mentality displayed by some in the majority if weightage or reservation for Sikhs in the Constituent Assembly was not possible, though a decision adopted by the Congress in its annual session held in December 1948 read, “We are clearly of the opinion that no question of rectification of the boundaries in Northern India should be raised at the present moment whatever the merits of such a proposal.” The Minority Committee formed by the Punjab Chief Minister made the case to the Assembly three weeks after the resolution's passing, though the Assembly was against even proportional reservation as potentially yielding to the Sikhs more than their supposed fair share, even denying Sikh representatives of scheduled castes concessions given to Hindu scheduled castes; Sikh members of the Assembly would refuse to sign the draft constitution to be enacted on 26 January 1950. Tara Singh himself was arrested on 20 February 1949 and imprisoned for several months, during which time the agitation was continued under the leadership of Sardar Hukam Singh, who in early 1950 described the demand for a Punjabi-speaking state was both secular and democratic. The Working Committee of the Akali Dal passed a resolution in May supporting creation of a state based on Punjabi language and culture.

Sachar Formula
The Sachar Formula was introduced on 2 October 1949 under the government of Bhim Sen Sachar to forestall the growing agitation. Drafted by two Hindu members and two Sikh members of the Congress party, it proposed making Punjabi as the medium of instruction up to the matriculation stage, in the “Punjabi zone” area, with Hindi taught as a compulsory subject from the end of the primary level onward, and vice-versa for “Hindi zone” areas; the "Punjabi zone" consisted of Gurdaspur, Amritsar, Hoshiarpur, Jalandhar, Ferozpur, and Ludhiana districts, along with Hissar district north of the Ghaggar river, and the Ropar and Kharar tehsils of Ambala district. Its goal had been bilingualism, but as it divided East Punjab into Punjabi and Hindi zones, it had the effect of sharpening the divide between the majority Sikh north and majority Hindu south. While many Akalis leaders were initially receptive to the formula, and Tara Singh was released at this time in the hopes that the formula would be accepted by the party, Tara Singh turned it down, reminding the Congress of its commitment to forming linguistic states, and that a Punjabi-speaking region had already been demarcated for the purposes of the Sachar Formula itself. The Akali Dal would hold its first major protest demonstration in August 1950.

While earlier in June 1948, both Punjabi and Hindi were both made official media of educational instruction, the Municipal Committee of Jalandhar in February 1949 resolved to make Devanagari Hindi the sole media in its schools, and the Senate of Panjab University refused to use Punjabi in any script; both were strongholds of the Arya Samaj, which, supported by its Jan Sangh and Hindu Mahasabha allies, had never accepted the formula or implemented it in its schools. To undercut the linguistic basis of the demand, the Arya Samaj embarked on a newspaper propaganda campaign to encourage the Hindus of even the Punjabi-speaking area to disown Punjabi entirely and select Hindi in censuses beginning in early 1951; this repudiation of Punjabi would be repeated in the 1961 census ten years later, and half of the demographic would continue to select Hindi even after the movement in the 1971 census. After failed efforts to absorb the Sikhs, and with the slogan of "Hindi, Hindu, Hindustan," Hindu organizations opted to spurn the language so that the Sikhs would be considered a linguistic minority as well as a religious minority, and thus prevent the formation of a state which would be Sikh-majority. In response, the Akali Dal mobilized the Sikhs of the region. This competition led to several clashes in Punjab, and heated electoral campaigns by the Akali Dal and Congress through to 1952; Congress would go on to win the election, but by forming and leading a coalition called the United Front with other opposition parties, the Akali Dal would go on to form the first non-Congress government of India in April 1952.

In August of that year, the Akali Dal would position itself as the premier representative for Sikh rights, broadcasting its victory in the subsequent annual elections and dislodging of the pro-Congress president of the Dal as a referendum for support for the Punjabi Suba among the Sikhs. The merging of PEPSU, which had been referred to as a "Sikh homeland" by Sardar Patel in July 1948, into the Punjabi-speaking region was also advocated in December by Tara Singh to further ensure Sikh territorial unity within the proposed Suba. The Akali Dal criticized Congress in its handling of PEPSU in relation to the designated Punjabi-speaking area, though the Congress announcement on 27 December 1953 of another States Reorganization Commission undercut accusations of division, and Congress retained control in the PEPSU elections in January 1954.

1953 States Reorganisation Commission
Though the calls for a Punjabi Suba were initially disregarded by the central government, the problem did not subside, and for the sake of the democratic functioning of the new democracy, another States Reorganization Commission was set up in 1953, stemming from new nationwide momentum for linguistic states. The Commission began its work in February 1954, and the Akali Dal submitted an 18-page memorandum on 14 May 1954, proposing the Punjabi Suba to include all of Punjab and Patiala and East Punjab States Union (PEPSU), as well as the Punjabi-speaking northern parts of Rajasthan, and to exclude the districts of Gurgaon and Rohtak, Panipat Tehsil in Karnal, and a few tehsils of Hisar district, which were to merge with Hindi-speaking regions. The Akalis drafted their case with care, strictly on the basis of language and using pre-1947 census figures, to present the proposed Punjabi-speaking state of an area over 35,000 square miles; they were supported in their effort by parties advocating rural interests, and complemented other linguistic state demands in the region. In a manifesto, the Akali Dal proposed that the establishment of a Punjabi state would enable education, administration, and cultural preservation in the language:

The Congress in Punjab, on the other hand, proposed the state integration of East Punjab, PEPSU, and Himachal Pradesh, which was similar to the submitted memoranda of the Arya Samaj and the Jan Sangh, which had proposed the amalgamation of not only these territories but even Delhi as well, and had both insisted paradoxically that citizens of India could "choose" their mother-tongue. The Commission tried to turn down the demand for Punjab state being advanced based on the argument that the formation of linguistic-based provinces would spur other demands for the separation of other linguistic groups elsewhere; such claims had already been advanced by Sikhs, Jats, and other groups. The reasons cited in its report were that it did not recognize Punjabi as a distinct language, and that the movement lacked enough support amongst the Hindus of the proposed Punjabi-speaking state setting aside the criterion of language in favor of sentiments. For many, the former was a larger setback; Hukum Singh wrote, "While others got States for their languages, we lost even our language," and Giani Kartar Singh remarked that out of the 14 national languages of the Constitution, only Punjabi was left without a state. With the language being distinct in grammar and lexicon, the Akali Dal regarded this reasoning as a pretext that amounted to religious discrimination, and that the demand would have been accepted without hesitation if the Sikhs were not set to be the majority.

The Akali Dal entered the 1955 Punjab SGPC elections on this platform and won resoundingly, winning all 110 seats it contested against the Punjab Congress, which had contested under the banner of the “Khalsa Dal,” which had only won 3 out of 132 contested seats. The results proved a strong morale booster for the party, which had demonstrated strong Sikh support for its platform, and felt encouraged to start a movement for the Punjabi Suba. The opportunity presented itself when on 6 April 1955 the Punjab Congress banned the shouting of Punjabi Suba slogans; twenty days later the Akali Dal issued an ultimatum to rescind the ban by 10 May or face an agitation.

1955 Slogan Agitation
Following the verdict of the Commission, the Akalis commenced the Punjabi Suba Slogan Agitation of 1955. Large numbers of summoned volunteers congregated at the Darbar Sahib in Amritsar from demonstrations all over the province, thus reviving the protest methods of the Akali movement of the 1920s. The SGPC, which provided logistical and organizational support for Sikh politics, significantly bolstered the party's effectiveness.

The Congress government did not lift the slogan ban, and the agitation began as promised on 10 May, with Tara Singh and ten companions being arrested for shouting Punjabi Suba slogans, as were successive groups of Akalis as they embarked from the temple doing the same. In the next five days more than 1,000 prominent Akali leaders were arrested; in nearly two months, 12,000 Sikhs had been arrested for the Slogan Agitation, and by the end of July as many as 21,000 Akalis were jailed in Congress efforts to quash the growing movement, which nevertheless continued steadily. Attempted negotiations with Congress led the agitation to be adjourned twice, though Jawaharlal Nehru continued to reject the demand for Punjab Suba.

On 12 July, the government under Sachar used the pretext of a “Nehru's triumphal return from peace mission abroad” to lift the ban on Punjabi Suba slogans and appealed for peace. However, Akali Dal did not celebrate the lifting of the ban on Punjab Suba slogans. Sachar government also announced the release of Akali prisoners in installments, which proved slow to be implemented; Tara Singh was released on 8 September, and the last Akalis were not released until 18 October.

1955 Golden Temple raid
A flashpoint during the agitation occurred on 4 July 1955, when a group led by Fateh Singh, who had joined the movement, had arrived from Ganganagar a few days prior to take part in the protest movement. Government police forces, led by DIG Ashwini Kumar, forced their entry into the temple premises and heavyhandedly took the entire group into custody, along with the head granthis of the Akal Takht and Golden Temple, volunteer protestors, and even cooks of the temple’s langar. 

The Guru Ram Das Serai and Shiromani Akali Dal offices were also raided, and batons used and tear gas and shells fired to disperse the protestors gathered on the periphery of the temple, damaging the periphery and sarovar, or pool, of the temple. The government stopped volunteers on the way to the Golden Temple, and troops were ordered to flag-march through the bazaars and streets surrounding the site.

According to Khalistani separatist Lakhbir Singh Rode, "fire was opened at Akal Takht and Golden Temple, and many Sikhs were killed".

Amritsar Convention
The States Reorganization Committee submitted its report to the Government of India on 10 September 1955 where it was considered and published on 10 October. The Commission recommended the integration of PEPSU and Himachal Pradesh with the Punjab, which was rejected by the Akali Dal a day after the report's release. Tara Singh took the opportunity to exhibit Sikh unity and resolution on this point, summoning a representative convention of Sikhs of all parties and organizations at Amritsar on 16 October 1955; nearly 1,300 invitees attended.

The Amritsar convention strongly rejected the Commission’s proposal, castigating it for bias against Sikh claims, as the Commission's recommendation was fully in accord with the most extreme elements opposing the Punjabi Suba, and even the Sachar Resolution, acknowledged as never having been implemented by those elements, was eroded. The resolution of the Amritsar Convention stated in part, “this convention of the Sikhs view with alarm and great resentment the complete and callous resolution of the States Reorganisation Commission of the just and reasonable demand for a Punjabi-speaking state.” The resolution called on the government to create the Punjabi Suba not only in the interest of the Sikhs but in the interest of the Hindi-speaking peoples of East Punjab; Tara Singh received authorization from the Amritsar Convention “to take suitable steps to for conveying the views and sentiments of the Sikh community to Government of India and urging them to do their duty to the Sikhs;” his first action was to arrange a conciliatory meeting with the Prime Minister, Jawaharlal Nehru, who had been quoted in the 9 January 1930 edition of the Lahore Bulletin during the freedom struggle that "the brave Sikhs of Punjab are entitled to special considerations. I see nothing wrong in an area set up in the North of India wherein the Sikhs can also experience the glow of freedom," though afterwards telling the Sikhs after the British left that the “circumstances had now changed." He had also strongly rejected the formation of Punjabi-speaking areas into a separate state when Lord Mountbatten had forwarded the suggestion from Baldev Singh and Giani Kartar Singh to him just prior to the Partition and population transfer. The meeting was facilitated by Baldev Singh, a former cabinet minister, who presented Nehru with correspondence between Sikh leaders and the Muslim League, reminding him that the Sikhs had rejected the League’s overtures to side with India. Baldev Singh would act as a mediator between the Akali leaders and the government in their meetings.

Government talks
The first meeting took place on 24 October 1955 in Delhi between the government, represented by Nehru and two of his senior cabinet colleagues, Maulana Abul Kalam Azad and Pandit Govind Ballabh Pant, and the Sikhs, represented by Master Tara Singh, who would present opening statements, Bhai Jodh Singh, also a member of the Chief Khalsa Diwan, who would explicate the language problem, Giani Kartar Singh and Sardar Hukam Singh, who were to meet the political points, and Sardar Gian Singh Rarewala; a second meeting followed on 23 November the same year.

Further meetings were put on hold in December due to the announcement of a general session of the Congress Party to be held in February 1956 in Amritsar;  the Shiromani Akali Dal’s  announcement of its own parallel congress, the orderly five-hour-long procession of which dwarfed in size that of the Congress convention,  provided another show of Sikh solidarity, with a large turnout of Sikhs from all over Punjab and beyond, with conservative estimates of over 100,000 marchers. Nehru biographer and contemporary observer Michael Brecher estimated the figure to be over double that, with participants being old and young, men and women, with many of them wearing the traditional Akali symbols of the kirpan and the blue turban, and observed the processioners raising chants of "Punjabi Suba Zindabad" ("Long live a Punjabi State") and "Master Tara Singh Zindabad," with intermittent music. The success of the Akali march helped talks with the government to resume. Talks again stalled by 26 February 1956 after the Sikh delegation perceived a lack of action during the meetings, but were resumed after Joginder Singh, a Sikh parliamentarian from Uttar Pradesh, persuaded the Sikhs to rejoin the talks.

The Regional Formula
Eventually both parties managed to break the impasse with a preliminary compromise based on a proposal first made in January 1956 by Hukam Singh: while stopping short of a Punjabi Suba, the state would be split into two regions in what would be called the Regional Formula: Punjabi and Hindi, with each region having its own committee consisting of its own share of Punjabi legislators, with powers to deliberate on all matters except law and order, finance, and taxation. The region would remain bilingual, but Punjabi in Gurmukhi would be the "regional" language, and the official language of the "Punjabi zone;" additionally, the Punjab Government would set up a separate department for the development of Punjabi alongside the one for Hindi, the central government would finally encourage Punjabi like any other regional language, and only PEPSU, and not Himachal Pradesh, would be merged with Punjab. The Regional Formula was put to a vote at a general meeting of the Shiromani Akali Dal at Amritsar on 11 March 1956. While there were critical voices raised, on grounds of constitutional propriety as well as the perceived inadequacy of the measure, and Giani Kartar Singh conceded that what was offered was not the Punjabi Suba of their conception, leaders including him, Jodh Singh, and Sardar Ajit Singh advocated acceptance of it as the beginning point, or tentative promise, of a Punjabi Suba. Master Tara Singh, however, was apprehensive of accepting the measure, which would weaken the Akali negotiating position, though it would go into effect on 1 November 1956.

On 23 September 1956 after approving the Regional Formula, the Akali Dal renounced its political programme, as part of its deal with Congress. Shifting its focus to the promotion of Sikh religious, educational, cultural, social and economic interests, and protecting Sikh fundamental rights, it was proposed that its large number of politically active members, including Giani Kartar Singh, be presented to Congress to further Akali political goals by joining and working through Congress. However, when the Congress assigned the Akali entrants 22 nominations for the Punjab Assembly and 3 for Parliament, Master Tara Singh, though now on good terms with Nehru, considered this as grossly inadequate, and considered the settlement void as far as he was concerned, though the Akali Dal continued to abide by it. Among the options left to him were to put up his own candidates against the Congress, which proved unsuccessful, and to politically reactivate the Shiromani Akali Dal, which he still controlled and set out to do.

Opposition to the Formula
Due to the insistence of the Sikhs of Punjab to not only have Punjabi as the official language as the basis for their proposed state, but also for Punjabi to be written exclusively in the Gurmukhi script, Hindus viewed the movement as an arrogant attempt to impose upon them the script of the Sikh religion and culture, as Hindus preferred and traditionally used the Devanagari script.

The Regional Formula met with resistance from Punjabi Hindus who opposed the formation of a Sikh-majority state, was opposed by Hindi language supporters of Punjab as being harmful to their interests, and under the Hindi Raksha Samiti, campaigned to have it annulled. The Arya Samaj regarded the Regional Formula as worse than the Sachar Formula they had ignored earlier, as the Punjabi-speaking "region" did not retain the Hindi option in the area for parents who wished to "choose" it as their language, and started a "save Hindi" movement supported by Arya Samajis including newspaper editors and educational board members; government concessions to their ideological demands compromised the language aspect of the Formula. Languages had been communalised far before independence, when Hindi was selected to be the symbol of Hindu nationalism, regardless of whose actual native language it was. 

In 1957, the Hindi Rakshi Samiti launched slogans like langri bhasha nahin parenge, gandi bhasha nahin parenge, jabri bhasha nahin parenge (we won’t study a crippled language, we won't study a dirty language, we won't study a language made obligatory," despite being based in Punjab; such behavior from the Hindi agitation until the end of the movement would leave lasting bitterness in Punjab.

During the course of the Hindi movement over several months, several Sikh gurdwaras had been desecrated, and the new Congress government, which had commenced on 3 April 1957 and was headed by the influential Partap Singh Kairon as Chief Minister and former Akalis and current cabinet members Giani Kartar Singh and Gian Singh Rarewala who served under him, dealt with it harshly, though as a result of the protests, the Regional Formula was not implemented by Kairon. The replacement of the Regional Formula became even more imperative for the central authorities with growing opposition to the usage of Punjabi and Gurmukhi among Punjabi Hindus even in the Punjabi zone.

Sikh sentiments remained hurt by the violent desecrations, the Sikh masses had not enthusiastically accepted the Regional Formula either, and though the post-independence intellectual and cultural context that had driven Punjabi advocacy and the initial drive toward the Formula did yield institutions like Punjabi University in 1956, the Formula was increasingly viewed as an inadequate solution to the Punjab problem, with neither the government or the political parties seeing potential in it. While the Akali Dal supported the Formula until March 1958, Tara Singh stated in June that he would be compelled to restart the Punjabi Suba struggle if the Resolution was not implemented, holding a Punjabi Province conference in October. Language frontiers had become communal frontiers, and Master Tara Singh considered the Punjabi Suba as the only solution against rising Hindi fanaticism. He called a general meeting of the Shiromani Akali Dal at Patiala on 14 February 1959, which 299 out of 377 members attended. The convention strongly supported restoring the political operation of the Akali Dal.

Partap Singh Kairon was himself an advocate of Punjabi and the founding of the Punjabi University for the support and development of the language along with Giani Kartar Singh. His own father Nihal Singh had been a prominent figure in the Singh Sabha enlightenment, the influence of which his own cultural perceptions and affiliations to Punjab and Sikhism had been moulded; he would refer to his proud Singh Sabha upbringing both privately and publicly. He pressed for the establishment of the university, though he repressed Akali influence in favour of bringing Congress influence into rural Punjab; politically active Akalis were still working through Congress per their earlier agreement during this time, joining during his leadership. Congress controlled 120 seats in the legislature out of 164, with 58 Sikhs among them, with nearly 50 representing the Punjabi "region," which had 71 seats total, though former Akali Sikhs were underrepresented compared to Congress Sikhs, and Tara Singh was not satisfied with the number of tickets given to former Akalis, regarding which he had not been consulted.

Renewed efforts for the Punjabi Suba
The Punjab Government under Kairon remained as politically firm dealing with rival supporters of Punjabi as it had done over the supporters of Hindi, and the political rivalry between Congress and the Akali Dal resulted in the narrow loss of Master Tara Singh in the election for the office of president of the SGPC to another Akali candidate, Prem Singh Lalpura. Tara Singh reacted by arranging a Punjabi Suba conference in Chandigarh, at which he announced his intention of launching a mass movement. He was subsequently arrested, though a silent procession in Delhi on 15 March 1959 proceeded as arranged; the procession, with portraits of Tara Singh, ended in a religious divan at Gurdwara Rakab Ganj Sahib, and Tara Singh was released from jail in under a week.

While in November 1958 Kairon narrowly dislodged Tara Singh from the SGPC presidency, his subsequent unconstitutional attempt to dilute the SGPC's democracy under the action of accommodating PEPSU representatives in the SGPC earned strong opposition from non-Congress Sikhs, which Tara Singh capitalized on by announcing another SGPC bid on the platform of the Punjabi Suba, securing the presidency and 132 out of 139 seats for the Akali Dal. The 1960 election was another contest between Kairon’s Congress and Tara Singh’s Akalis. Congress Sikhs worked to defeat the Akalis; Giani Kartar Singh even resigned from his ministry to focus solely on campaigning, and with help from the state government created the Sadh Sangat Board to contest the elections. The Shiromani Akali Dal overwhelmingly won the elections however, taking 136 seats to the Sadh Sangat Board’s four. All the Akali members assembled at the Akal Takht on 24 January 1960 to pledge to resume the Punjabi Suba struggle. Another Punjabi Suba convention was held on 22 May 1960, to which members of the Swatantra Party and Praja Socialist Party were invited. Presided over by Pandit Sundar Lal and former Congress member Saifuddin Kitchlew, the main resolution was moved by Sardar Gurnam Singh, calling upon the government "not to delay any more the inevitable formation" of a Punjabi-speaking state, especially when language-based states had been carved out in other parts of the country.

With the movement again gaining momentum, another march was announced to commence on 29 May 1960, going through the Punjabi countryside to end at Delhi to join a Sikh procession on 12 June 1960, stopping at important Gurdwaras to make speeches to rally support for the Punjabi Suba. Tara Singh was arrested and detained in jail on the night of the 24th, and the government cracked down heavy-handedly on the Akalis, with large-scale arrests made throughout the Punjab, including many other Akali leaders and legislators, and lines of arrests at Amritsar, at which the Golden Temple was the main center of mobilization, and Delhi. Nearly 18,000 Akalis courted arrest by July, and Akali newspapers were suppressed. Akali leaders made stirring speeches asserting the Sikhs’ right to self-determination, and the evening divans, or assemblies, at Manji Sahib attracted vast audiences. Nehru, recommending bilingualism for everyone in the province, continued to oppose its bifurcation, though Kairon would start to release some Akali protesters from jail to give the impression that they were easing their position. Four detainees would be killed in police fire while agitating for their release.

Under Sant Fateh Singh
With Tara Singh in jail, his second-in-command Sant Fateh Singh directed the movement from the Golden Temple in his absence, assisted by the Sikh Students Federation in delivering speeches drawing from Sikh history to garner support, in 1960. A religious leader without a long background in politics, Fateh Singh was nevertheless an effective leader, and presented the demand for the Punjabi Suba as based on linguistic considerations alone, bringing it in line with the country’s declared goals of democracy and secularism, and what was considered most important was the creation of a unit comprising all Punjabi-speaking areas, with Punjabi as the official language, over religious demography. He tactically stressed the linguistic basis of the demand, while downplaying its religious basis — a state where the distinct Sikh identity could be preserved, though, in regard to the additional significance of minority rights, stating, "No status is given to the Punjabi language, because Sikhs speak it. If non-Sikhs had owned Punjabi as their mother tongue, then the rulers of India would have seen no objection in establishing a Punjabi State." As a Jat Sikh, he held a strong constituency among, and furthered the shift in political power to, the rural peasantry and the gurdwaras.The government resorted to rigorous measures to put down the agitation, but volunteers continued to join and the movement continued, even as thousands of Sikhs were put in jail.

On 29 October 1960, Fateh Singh wrote to Jawaharlal Nehru saying that if the Sikhs’ democratic and constitutional demand for a Punjabi-speaking area was not accepted, he would go on a fast (a novelty in Sikh tradition), seeking to impress upon him the Sikhs’ sense of grievance and the repressiveness of the Congress-run Punjab Government, and arguing that it was necessary to give his life to save the country from "dictatorial rule under the garb of democracy." Nehru did not intervene, and the fast commenced on 18 December 1960. Before entering his hut on the Golden Temple premises, he addressed a large gathering of Sikhs, instructing them to keep the movement peaceful, saying that damage to the country was damage to themselves. A roster of ten Sikhs was drafted to continue the movement in case Fateh Singh’s fast ended in death.

Indian leaders of diverse opinion attempted to intervene to persuade Fateh Singh to abandon the fast, though he would not withdraw from his resolution. With growing national concern over his life, Nehru in a speech in Chandigarh on 20 December 1960 admitted that Punjabi was the dominant language of the Punjab and that it must be promoted in every way; this was repeated in a speech in Rajpura later in the day. On 23 December and again on 31 December he made a personal appeal to Fateh Singh to stop the fast.

Assurance from Nehru
Chief Minister Partap Singh Kairon, under the advice of his old teacher and informal counsel Jodh Singh, set Tara Singh free on 4 January 1961, ostensibly to consult Fateh Singh, but in the hopes of reducing the chances of agreement between him and Nehru. Tara Singh immediately called on Fateh Singh, severely weakened from his fast, then arranged to meet Nehru while he was in Bhavnagar, Gujarat for the annual Congress session. On a specially chartered flight from Delhi to Bhavnagar, he was accompanied by Harbans Singh Gujral, Lachhman Singh Gill, Hargurnad Singh, Harcharan Singh of Bathinda, and Seth Ram Nath, one Punjabi Hindu who openly espoused the cause for a Punjabi-speaking state. While in flight the group held mutual consultations and reduced their minimal demand in writing.

On 7 January 1961, Tara Singh held a two-hour meeting with Nehru, who was convinced that the demand of Punjab Suba was actually a communal demand in the garb of linguistic reorganization, without result. The next day, Nehru added a postscript to what he had told Tara Singh, that the formation of forming linguistic states had not halted due to any discrimination against Punjab or distrust of the Sikhs, and that "Punjab state is broadly speaking a Punjabi Suba with Punjabi as the dominant language," conveying consideration to making all of Punjab unilingual. He also expressed concern regarding Fateh Singh’s health and wished to see his fast ended. This reassured Tara Singh, who had a call made to Amritsar stating that the obligations of his vow had been fulfilled, and asking him to terminate his fast, a motion also adopted by the Working Committee of the Akali Dal, who on behalf of the Khalsa, told Fateh Singh that they were satisfied the his pledge had been complied with and that he must end his fast.

Fateh Singh ended his 22-day fast with a glass of juice on 9 January 1961, marking the end of the seven-month-long morcha, or movement. According to official government figures, 30,000 Sikhs had been placed in jail over the course of the morcha which had taken place over the period of 1960-1961; they were released when Fateh Singh ended his fast. In total, 57,129 Sikhs would be placed in jail over the course of the movement.

Ascendance of Fateh Singh
Political negotiations resumed between the Akalis and the government, with three meetings between Fateh Singh and Nehru on 8 February 1961, 1 March 1961, and 12 May 1961. While cordial, they did not yield solid results; Nehru offered to extend protection to the Punjabi language and look into Sikh grievances, but continued not accept Punjabi-speaking areas forming a separate state, which was not accepted by Sikhs. In addition to Nehru's own view on the matter, political pressure on him and false propaganda from other communities began to depict Akalis as foreign agents, which the Akalis took offense at. To impress this point, Tara Singh himself embarked on a fast on 15 August 1961, during which notable Sikh mediators like Maharaja Yadavinder Singh of Patiala, and Hardit Singh Malik kept in touch with Nehru and Home Minister Lal Bahadur Shastri on one hand and Akali leaders on the other. Hardit Malik had come to Amritsar as an emissary of Nehru, and Tara Singh ended his fast during his visit. Seeing this as a sign of an impending settlement between the Akalis and Congress, anti-Punjabi lobbies reacted strongly, with Arya Samaj ideologue and news editor Lala Jagat Narain, who had resigned as minister due to the Regional Formula, warning on 6 October that "the Hindus of Punjab would never accept the settlement."

Having ended his fast without concrete progress on the issue after 48 days on 1 October 1961, criticism among Sikhs and damage to his reputation among them began to grow, as the pledge solemnized at the Akal Takht was perceived to have been broken without achieving the stated target, and was thus seen as violating a religious vow. The responsibility for having Fateh Singh’s vow ended was also directed at Tara Singh. A committee of five Sikh religious notables (Panj Pyare council), including religious scholars, jathedars of Kesgarh Sahib and the Akal Takht, and the head granthi of the Darbar Sahib, were selected and authorized on 24 November 1961 to investigate and determine the circumstances leading to the ending of the fast and determine penalties. Five days later, they pronounced Tara Singh guilty of breaking his word and blemishing the Sikh tradition of religious steadfastness and sacrifice, and he was ordered to perform additional prayers for a month and clean the shoes of the sangat, or congregation, and the dishes of the langar, or open community kitchen, for five days. Fateh Singh was also to recite extra prayers and wash "langar" dishes for five days for his own fast ending, though it was recognized that his fast had ended at Tara Singh’s request. Photographs of Tara Singh’s service were circulated widely in newspapers and served to somewhat rehabilitate his popular image and he was forgiven by the council of five, though his political reputation never fully recovered, and he had begun to be rejected by crowds at divans as far back as when after Fateh Singh’s fast had ended. As a result of developing differences over strategy and tactics among the Akali leadership, Fateh Singh would begin to eclipse him as the leader of the movement, and by 1962 after a period of interparty schism, had been elected president of the Akali Dal, and had the support of the majority faction.

Sikh votes, often divided among the Congress and Akali Dal, were consolidated for the Akalis in the 1962 elections; while Congress won with 90 out of 154 votes, Kairon only narrowly re-won his office, regarded by many as resulting from rigging. In the Punjabi-speaking region, over 70 percent of the over 2 million Sikh votes went for the Akalis, though while Tara Singh also won back his position on the SGPC, only 74 of the 160 voting members had voted, with the rest abstaining in protest due to the continued stigma of Tara Singh breaking his pledge, and he was condemned again in a July 1962 convention in Ludhiana; Fateh Singh would continue to lead the movement on a purely linguistic basis after Tara Singh was narrowly dislodged from his position in a no-confidence vote in October with 76 votes to 72, which created a brief rift among the Akalis when the Delhi Sikh Gurdwara Management Committee broke with the SPGC in Amritsar in support of Tara Singh; another attempt by Tara Singh to dislodge Fateh Singh from the SGPC with a no-confidence vote in June 1963 failed. A close associate of Fateh Singh, Sant Channan Singh, was elected SGPC president, further consolidating Fateh Singh’s position in 1965, when Fateh Singh's faction defeated Tara Singh's with ninety seats to 45 in the SGPC on 18 January. With the parallel factions remaining divided, Tara Singh withdrawing from the scene for six months for contemplation amid dwindling political fortunes, though his supporters remained active.

Partap Singh Kairon's administration had also been attracting corruption charges amidst ebbing support in 1963; he resigned on 14 June 1964, though leaving behind a legacy of attempted communal harmony, Punjabi University, helping Punjab's agricultural peasantry with farming loans and techniques, electric power, infrastructure to attempt to draw the Jatts and other agriculturalists away from the Akalis, and the beginnings of Punjab's Green Revolution, which would go on to have strong influence on Punjab's political course in the coming decades, though Akali disagreement with Congress also alienated Sikh peasantry from Congress.

Das Commission
Meanwhile, following the pending settlement made up to that point, Nehru appointed a commission chaired by S. R. Das to address the question of Sikh grievances in December 1961. The Akali Dal did not agree with its composition or its scope, and did not present its case to it, though the commission carried on regardless, and rejected suggestions of anti-Sikh discrimination while denying the demand for a Punjabi-speaking state as a Sikh state. The few recommendations that were fielded by the Das commission included those by Arya Samaj editor Virendra who denied the separate status of Punjabi and the legitimacy of Gurmukhi as anything more than a religious script, and Balraj Madhok of the Jan Sangh who cited the Regional Formula and regional committees as the real sources of trouble to be scrapped. Submitting its report in February 1962, which was accepted immediately by the central government in light of rapidly approaching elections, it relayed that the Regional Formula had been delayed but not blocked, and therefore no injustice had been done.

Nalwa Conference
Following a conference in Ludhiana beginning in May 1965, attention to the Punjabi Suba, the shared objective of both factions of the Akali Dal, was renewed on 4 July. Named the Nalwa Conference after famed Sikh general Hari Singh Nalwa of the Sikh Empire, the main Conference resolution was drawn up by eminent Sikh scholar and intellectual Kapur Singh, and moved by Gurnam Singh, then leader of the opposition in the Punjab Legislative Assembly, and seconded by Giani Bhupinder Singh, then president of Tara Singh’s faction of the Akali Dal. The resolution read as follows:

While the demand had been for a self-determined status within the Union, the Hindi and Urdu presses interpreted this as a call for a sovereign Sikh state. Later in an agreement in October 1968, a resolution which would reflect the ideas of Kapur Singh, who would become the senior vice president of the Akali Dal in 1969, would state that the Khalsa was "a sovereign people by birthright," the command of Guru Gobind Singh, and by the course of Sikh history, advocating for autonomous status in a demarcated territory within India, and that the national Constitution "should be on a correct federal basis and that the states should have greater autonomy," referring to the powers of all states of the country. This had be "the Congress party in power has abused the Constitution to the detriment of the non-Congress Governments, and uses its power for its party interest."

Government deliberations
On 24 July 1965, Tara Singh ended his self-exile from politics, and on 2 August, he addressed a press conference in Delhi, applauded and pledged support for the Nalwa Conference resolution, calling for the Sikhs’ "place in the sun of free India." Fateh Singh announced on 16 August that in order to secure the Punjabi Suba he would commence another fast on 10 September, and if it was unsuccessful, on the 25th he would self-immolate at the Akal Takht. SGPC president Channan Singh, Gurcharan Singh Tohra, and Harcharan Singh Hudiara went to Delhi on 8 September to attend a high-level meeting with prominent government leaders including Yadavinder Singh, the Defense Minister, The Minister of State for Home Affairs, and members of Parliament. They requested Fateh Singh to defer the fast in light of the declaration of the Indo-Pakistani War of 1965; some, including the Yadavinder Singh, gave their assurance of support for the Punjabi Suba cause if the government continued to avoid the demand after normalcy was restored. This message was relayed to Fateh Singh on 9 September as Channan Singh and the Akali leaders returned to Amritsar. Fateh Singh accepted the request and appealed to the Sikhs in Punjab to support the war effort and the senior commanders, who were almost all Sikh.

Formation
In 1963, the Sikhs and the Punjab had contributed massive amounts of wealth to the war effort against China in 1962, with over 20 million rupees to the defense fund including 50,000 rupees directly from Fateh Singh to Nehru, and gold double the weight of Nehru, encouraged by the Akalis who anti-Punjabi groups in Punjab had earlier attempted to portray as traitorous. Only following the change in Akali Dal leadership and the role of the Sikhs in the 1965 war, which generated strong support among the Sikh population, did the center begin to consider acceding to the long-standing Sikh demand.

The Indo-Pakistani War of 1965 ended 21 days later with a ceasefire on 22 September, with both sides claiming victory. More demonstrations of patriotism prompted the Indian government, who after Nehru's death in 1964 had leadership that was more open to consider regional demands, to revisit the Punjabi Suba issue in light of the contributions in the war effort by Sikhs, who had previously been seen with mistrust and apprehension by the government. Stories of the bravery and patriotism of the Sikhs during the war had already been circulating, and on 6 September the Union Home Minister, Gulzarilal Nanda, had made a statement in the Lok Sabha that "the whole question of formation of Punjabi-speaking state could be examined afresh with an open mind." Later on the 23rd he declared the formation of a committee of the Cabinet to pursue the matter further, with the stated hope that "the efforts of this Cabinet Committee and of the Parliamentary Committee will lead to a satisfactory settlement of the question." The Punjab Congress Committee also debated the issue at length, with Zail Singh, General Mohan Singh, and Narain Singh Shahbazpuri lending their full support.
In the Parliament, the Home Minister sent a list of nominees from the Rajya Sabha to the Chairman and a list of nominees from the Lok Sabha to the Speaker, Sardar Hukam Singh, who announced the final 22-person committee representing all sections of the House, including representatives from the Akali Dal, Congress, Jana Sangh, Swatantra Party, Communists, and independents.f

The period for receiving memoranda from the various parties and individuals was set from October to 5 November 1965. Preliminary discussions were held from 26 November to 25 December 1965. On 10 January 1966, the SGPC’s general secretary Lachhman Singh Gill and executive member Rawel Singh met the committee and presented the case for a Punjabi-speaking state. On the 27th, Giani Kartar Singh and Harcharan Singh Brar appeared in the Punjab legislature on behalf of Congress, also arguing in favor of it. Of the memoranda submitted to the committee, nearly 2,200 supported the Punjabi Suba and 903 opposing. Hukam Singh was thus able to secure string support from the assembled committee for its creation. In reaction to the committee's recommendation to the central government of a state with Punjabi as its official language on 9 March 1966, there were strikes, arson and murder, including 3 Congressmen burnt alive in Panipat, including an old associate of Bhagat Singh, generally believed to have been orchestrated by the Jan Sangh, who still opposed the Punjabi Suba.

The Parliamentary Committee’s report was handed in on 15 March 1966; the Congress Working Committee had already adopted a motion on the 6th recommending the government to carve out a Punjabi-speaking state out of the erstwhile East Punjab state. The report was made public on 18 March, and the demand was conceded on 23 April, with a commission appointed on 17 April to demarcate the new states of Punjab and Haryana, and transferring certain areas to Himachal Pradesh. The Punjab Reorganisation Act, 1966 was passed on 18 September in the Lok Sabha, and on 1 November 1966, a Punjabi-speaking state became a reality.

Implementation
The Akali Dal took issue with the conceived form of the state of Punjab as presented, the form in which it continues to exist currently. Akali Dal opposed the implementation of the Punjab Reorganisation Act on 1 November 1966 and Akali leaders protested against it. Several months before its inauguration, Fateh Singh expressed his dissatisfaction over several issues of contention, including genuinely Punjabi-speaking areas being left out of the new state and given to Haryana and Himachal Pradesh (as a result of the falsified linguistic returns of the 1961 census), Chandigarh was being turned into a Union Territory, the level of autonomy of the states, and power and irrigation projects were to be taken over by the central government, instead of the state retaining control of them.

The trifurcation was to done by tehsil, rather than village, and would further skew the process. two Commission members had proposed the exclusion of Kharar tehsil from Punjab, which, while unimplemented, had been the first sign that the adjacent Chandigarh was potentially not to go to Punjab state. Chandigarh had been the planned capital of Punjab and was built to replace Lahore, the capital of erstwhile Punjab and of the Sikh Empire, which became part of Pakistan during the partition. Chandigarh was claimed by both Haryana and Punjab. Pending resolution of the dispute, it was declared as a separate Union Territory which would serve as the capital of both the states, while Haryana would ostensibly set up its own capital city. Though the Union Government had decided to give Chandigarh to Punjab as solely its capital in 1970, per a formal communication issued by the Union government on 29 January 1970, and Haryana was granted five years and a proposed budget of 200 million rupees to set up its own capital, this has not been implemented, though Chandigarh had been conceived to be the capital of a single state. However, the 1970 decision to be implemented in 1975 was made contingent on the transfer of territory in Fazilka to Haryana, to be made accessible through a corridor, and the process again stalled.

Akali leader Fateh Singh declared he would commit self-immolation on 27 December 1966. The Union government was concerned at this announcement and continued negotiations on the demands. An hour before the scheduled time of 4 pm on 27 December for immolation, after Hukam Singh arrived in Amritsar and told a large congregation at the Golden Temple that Indira Gandhi, who had assumed power on 20 January 1966, had agreed to arbitrate on the outstanding issues and that Chandigarh belonged to Punjab, Fateh Singh called off his immolation bid under this understanding, though she would state on 8 January 1967 that no assurances had been made on Chandigarh, and talks were unsuccessful. He would fast again before the 1970 decision. He would continue to demand the inclusion of Chandigarh and other Punjabi-speaking areas left out of Punjab until his death in 1972.

The demand was additionally advanced by Darshan Singh Pheruman, a veteran Akali leader with a long history of participating in Sikh political rights movements, from the Akali movement during which he was jailed for a year in 1921 and the Jaito Morcha of 1923-25 to reinstate Sikh leaders of Punjabi princely states removed by the British in which he was jailed again three years later. He went to the jail three times during the course of the Punjabi Suba movement. Declaring the country as free but the panth still in bondage without a Sikh homeland, the party's Working Committee resolved to continue to struggle for the objectives of Fateh Singh's fast, with nearly all Punjabi parties participating in a huge procession in Chandigarh to have it included. He was arrested and sent to jail, where he continued his fast. He died on 27 October 1969, on the 74th day of his hunger strike.

Despite the success of the movement in the creation of the state of Punjab, its implementation left many unresolved issues behind, including the allocation of the capital city of Chandigarh, which is the only state capital in the country to be shared with another state, adjustment of some of the territorial claims of Punjab, with many large Punjabi-speaking areas left out of the allocated state, and the distribution of river waters which remains unresolved. The national government's centralizing impulses, as manifest in issues like wheat procurement, water resources, and power resources, generated further Sikh disaffection, strengthening the belief that New Delhi was trying to impose a "political brake" on the community's economic and social advancement. This unresolved tension would lead to campaigns for more state autonomy throughout the 1970s. To this end, the Akali Dal would draft the Anandpur Sahib Resolution in the 1970s, and re-launch the movement in the form of the Dharam Yudh Morcha in 1982; by 1983 more than 40,000 Akali protestors had courted arrest, with thousands remaining in jail for months, and some for years. These issues continue to figure prominently in Punjab politics and remain points of contention between the state and the central government.

Bibliography

See also
Singh Sabha Movement

References

History of the Republic of India
History of Punjab, India (1947–present)
Reorganisation of Indian states
Language conflict in India
Politics of Punjab, India
Punjabi nationalism
Indira Gandhi administration
Nehru administration